Steven Hayward, Stephen Hayward, or Steve Hayward could refer to: 

Steven F. Hayward (born 1958), American political commentator
Steve Hayward (born 1971), English footballer
Steven Hayward (Canadian writer), Canadian novelist
Stephen Hayward (1954–2015), British publisher, founder of the Serif publishing house